The 2019 Virginia Cavaliers women's soccer team represented University of Virginia during the 2019 NCAA Division I women's soccer season.  The Cavaliers were led by head coach Steve Swanson, in his nineteenth season.  They played home games at Klöckner Stadium.  This was the team's 34th season playing organized men's college soccer and their 32nd playing in the Atlantic Coast Conference

The Cavaliers finished the season 17–2–3, 6–0–3 in ACC play to finish in third place.  As the third seed in the ACC Tournament, they defeated Duke in the quarterfinals and Florida State in the semifinals. In the final, they ended up losing to North Carolina. They received an at-large bid to the NCAA Tournament where they defeated Radford before losing to Washington State in the Second Round.

Squad

Roster 
Updated June 26, 2020

Team management

Source:

Schedule 

Source:

|-
!colspan=7 style=""| Exhibition
|-

|-
!colspan=7 style=""| Non-Conference Regular Season
|-

|-
!colspan=7 style=""| ACC Regular Season

|-
!colspan=7 style=""| ACC Tournament

|-
!colspan=7 style=""| NCAA Tournament

2020 NWSL College Draft

Source:

Rankings

References 

Virginia
Virginia Cavaliers women's soccer seasons
2019 in sports in Virginia